The 1999 Florida Gators baseball team represented the University of Florida in the sport of baseball during the 1999 college baseball season. The Gators competed in Division I of the National Collegiate Athletic Association (NCAA) and the Eastern Division of the Southeastern Conference (SEC). They played their home games at Alfred A. McKethan Stadium, on the university's Gainesville, Florida campus. The team was coached by Andy Lopez, who was in his fifth season at Florida.

Roster

Schedule 

! style="background:#FF4A00;color:white;"| Regular Season
|- valign="top" 

|- align="center" bgcolor="ddffdd"
| February 6 || No. 6 Miami (FL)Rivalry|| No. 14
| McKethan Stadium ||7–4
|Brice (1–0)
|Walker (0–1)
|None
|5,169
|1–0||–
|- align="center" bgcolor="ddffdd"
| February 7 || No. 6 Miami (FL)Rivalry|| No. 14|| McKethan Stadium ||14–12||Grezlovski (1–0)||Neu (1–1)||None||4,431||2–0||–
|- align="center" bgcolor="ffdddd"
| February 12 ||at No. 8 Miami (FL)Rivalry|| No. 6||Mark Light StadiumCoral Gables, FL||4–7||Walker (1–1)||Brice (1–1)||Neu (1)||3,560||2–1||–
|- align="center" bgcolor="ffdddd"
| February 13 ||at No. 8 Miami (FL)Rivalry|| No. 6||Mark Light Stadium||3–10||Howell (1–0)||Hart (0–1)||None||3,722||2–2||–
|- align="center" bgcolor="F0E8E8"
| February 16||Chuo Gakuin (exh.)|| No. 7||McKethan Stadium||0–0||None||None||None||510||–||–
|- align="center" bgcolor="ddffdd"
| February 20 ||at No. 1 Florida StateRivalry|| No. 7||Dick Howser StadiumTallahassee, FL||6–5||McClendon (1–0)||Chavez (1–1)||Brice (1)||4,841||3–2||–
|- align="center" bgcolor="ffdddd"
| February 21 ||at No. 1 Florida StateRivalry|| No. 7||Dick Howser Stadium||3–12||Stocks (3–0)||Belflower (0–1)||None||4,612||3–3||–
|- align="center" bgcolor="ddffdd"
| February 24 |||| No. 6|| McKethan Stadium ||8–5||Cardozo (1–0)||Benton (1–2)||None||1,255||4–3||–
|- align="center" bgcolor="ddffdd"
| February 27 || No. 1 Florida StateRivalry|| No. 6|| McKethan Stadium ||4–2||McClendon (2–0)||Chavez (1–2)||None||5,657||5–3||–
|- align="center" bgcolor="ffdddd"
| February 28 || No. 1 Florida StateRivalry|| No. 6|| McKethan Stadium ||4–8||Stocks (4–0)||Hart (0–2)||None||5,203||5–4||–
|-

|- align="center" bgcolor="ddffdd"
| March 2 |||| No. 6|| McKethan Stadium ||10–4||Brice (2–1)||McDonald (0–1)||None||1,888||6–4
|–
|- align="center" bgcolor="ddffdd"
| March 3 ||UNC Greensboro|| No. 6|| McKethan Stadium ||16–7||McClendon (3–0)||–||–||–||7–4
|–
|- align="center" bgcolor="ddffdd"
| March 5 |||| No. 6|| McKethan Stadium ||4–2||Belflower (1–1)||Jackson (0–1)||Grezlovski (1)||1,726||8–4
|–
|- align="center" bgcolor="ddffdd"
| March 6 ||Central Michigan|| No. 6|| McKethan Stadium ||4–3||Grezlovski (2–0)||Hesselink (0–1)||None||1,872||9–4
|–
|- align="center" bgcolor="ddffdd"
| March 7 ||Central Michigan|| No. 6|| McKethan Stadium ||7–2||Grezlovski (3–0)||Smoot (0–1)||None||2,417||10–4
|–
|- align="center" bgcolor="ffdddd"
| March 9 |||| No. 5|| McKethan Stadium ||3–4||Sundsmo (1–1)||Grezlovski (3–1)||None||1,069||10–5||–
|- align="center" bgcolor="ddffdd"
| March 10 ||Winthrop|| No. 5|| McKethan Stadium ||8–7||McFarland (1–0)||Horner (1–1)||Grezlovski (2)||1,073||11–5||–
|- align="center" bgcolor="ffdddd"
| March 12 ||at No. 9 || No. 5||Alex Box StadiumBaton Rouge, LA||3–8||Ainsworth (5–0)||McClendon (3–1)||None||7,219||11–6||0–1
|- align="center" bgcolor="ddffdd"
| March 14 (1) ||at No. 9 LSU|| No. 5||Alex Box Stadium||6–4||Brice (3–1)||Bowe (4–1)||Cardozo (1)||6,921||12–6||1–1
|- align="center" bgcolor="ffdddd"
| March 14 (2) ||at No. 9 LSU|| No. 5||Alex Box Stadium||5–7||Hodges (1–1)||Grezlovski (3–2)||None||6,772||12–7||1–2
|- align="center" bgcolor="ddffdd"
| March 16 |||| No. 12|| McKethan Stadium ||5–4||Coleman (1–0)||Kozlowski (0–2)||Grezlovski (3)||1,034||13–7||–
|- align="center" bgcolor="ddffdd"
| March 17 |||| No. 12|| McKethan Stadium ||10–6||DeVaughan (1–0)||Elliott (0–1)||None||1,079||14–7||–
|- align="center" bgcolor="ddffdd"
| March 19 |||| No. 12|| McKethan Stadium ||14–2||Brice (4–1)||Brown (1–1)||None||2,465||15–7||2–2
|- align="center" bgcolor="ddffdd"
| March 20 ||Tennessee|| No. 12|| McKethan Stadium ||9–813||Grezlovski (4–2)||Tisdale (3–5)||None||3,242||16–7||3–2
|- align="center" bgcolor="ddffdd"
| March 21 ||Tennessee|| No. 12|| McKethan Stadium ||18–2||McClendon (4–1)||Patterson (2–3)||Rodriguez (1)||2,898||17–7||4–2
|- align="center" bgcolor="ddffdd"
| March 23 |||| No. 11|| McKethan Stadium ||12–6||Cardozo (2–0)||Hanson (0–1)||McFarland (1)||1,348||18–7||–
|- align="center" bgcolor="ddffdd"
| March 24 ||Troy State|| No. 11|| McKethan Stadium ||10–1||Brice (5–1)||Shelley (2–1)||Grezlovski (4)||1,575||19–7||–
|- align="center" bgcolor="ddffdd"
| March 26 ||at || No. 11||Foley FieldAthens, GA||6–5||Grezlovski (5–2)||Sledge (1–1)||None||854||20–7||5–2
|- align="center" bgcolor="ddffdd"
| March 27 ||at Georgia|| No. 11||Foley Field||8–710||Grezlovski (6–2)||Goodson (4–2)||None||1,346||21–7||6–2
|- align="center" bgcolor="ffdddd"
| March 28 ||at Georgia|| No. 11||Foley Field||3–12||–||–||–||–||21–8||6–3
|- align="center" bgcolor="ffdddd"
| March 30 |||| No. 10|| McKethan Stadium ||5–611||–||–||–||–||21–9||–
|-

|- align="center" bgcolor="ffdddd"
| April 2 |||| No. 10|| McKethan Stadium ||1–8||Walling (5–1)||McClendon (4–2)||None||3,375||21–10||6–4
|- align="center" bgcolor="ffdddd"
| April 3 ||Arkansas|| No. 10|| McKethan Stadium ||5–6||Wright (1–4)||Grezlovski (6–4)||None||2,967||21–11||6–5
|- align="center" bgcolor="ffdddd"
| April 4 ||Arkansas|| No. 10|| McKethan Stadium ||5–10||–||–||–||–||21–12||6–6
|- align="center" bgcolor="ddffdd"
| April 7 |||| No. 19|| McKethan Stadium ||20–4||–||–||–||–||22–12||–
|- align="center" bgcolor="ffdddd"
| April 9 ||at || No. 19||Swayze FieldOxford, MS||0–8||McAvoy (6–3)||McClendon (4–3)||None||2,007||22–13||6–7
|- align="center" bgcolor="ffdddd"
| April 10 ||at Ole Miss|| No. 19||Swayze Field||5–611||–||–||–||–||22–14||6–8
|- align="center" bgcolor="ffdddd"
| April 11 ||at Ole Miss|| No. 19||Swayze Field||4–14||Lyons (2–1)||Belflower (1–2)||None||1,906||22–15||6–9
|- align="center" bgcolor="ddffdd"
| April 14 ||at ||||Conrad ParkDeLand, FL||9–5||Rodriguez (1–0)||Welch (0–2)||None||2,486||23–15||–
|- align="center" bgcolor="ffdddd"
| April 16 |||||| McKethan Stadium ||0–5||Kent (2–5)||Cardozo (2–1)||None||1,125||23–16||6–10
|- align="center" bgcolor="ffdddd"
| April 17 ||Kentucky|||| McKethan Stadium ||2–9||Shaffar (4–4)||Belflower (1–3)||None||1,875||23–17||6–11
|- align="center" bgcolor="ddffdd"
| April 18 ||Kentucky|||| McKethan Stadium ||10–3||Brice (6–3)||Webb (2–4)||None||1,591||24–17||7–11
|- align="center" bgcolor="ddffdd"
| April 21 ||Stetson|||| McKethan Stadium ||7–1||Hart (2–2)||House (3–6)||None||1,704||25–17||–
|- align="center" bgcolor="ffdddd"
| April 23 || No. 22 |||| McKethan Stadium ||14–15||Hadden (7–2)||Cardozo (2–2)||Pomar (8)||2,358||25–18||7–12
|- align="center" bgcolor="ddffdd"
| April 24 || No. 22 South Carolina|||| McKethan Stadium ||8–4||Grezlovski (7–5)||Bouknight (6–3)||None||2,408||26–18
|8–12
|- align="center" bgcolor="ddffdd"
| April 25 || No. 22 South Carolina|||| McKethan Stadium ||5–4||Grezlovski (8–5)||Pomar (2–2)||None||2,057||27–18
|9–12
|- align="center" bgcolor="ddffdd"
| April 30 ||at |||| McGugin FieldNashville, TN ||5–4||Grezlovski (9–5)||Maultsby (1–6)||None||348||28–18
|10–12
|-

|- align="center" bgcolor="ddffdd"
| May 1 ||at Vanderbilt|||| Greer StadiumNashville, TN ||17–6||Brice (7–3)||Beal (3–2)||None||1,216||29–18||11–12
|- align="center" bgcolor="ddffdd"
| May 2 ||at Vanderbilt|||| McGugin Field ||10–7||Hart (3–2)||Prior (4–8)||None||311||30–18||12–12
|- align="center" bgcolor="ffdddd"
| May 5 |||||| McKethan Stadium ||7–11||Royal (1–1)||Belflower (1–4)||None||1,584||30–19||–
|- align="center" bgcolor="ffdddd"
| May 7 ||||||Dudy Noble FieldStarkville, MS||0–9||Compton (6–1)||Cardozo (2–3)||None||3,922||30–20||12–13
|- align="center" bgcolor="ddffdd"
| May 8 ||||||Dudy Noble Field||6–4||Rodriguez (2–0)||Thoms (7–4)||Grezlovski (5)||5,975||31–20||13–13
|- align="center" bgcolor="ffdddd"
| May 9 ||||||Dudy Noble Field||8–15||Ginter (7–6)||Hart (3–3)||None||3,813||31–21
|13–14
|- align="center" bgcolor="ffdddd"
| May 11 |||||| McKethan Stadium ||7–8||Arnold (7–4)||Grezlovski (9–6)||None||1,630||31–22
|–
|- align="center" bgcolor="ffdddd"
| May 14 || No. 12 Alabama|||| McKethan Stadium ||10-12||Blankenship (8–2)||Grezlovski (9–7)||None||2,584||31–23
|13–15
|- align="center" bgcolor="ffdddd"
| May 15 || No. 12 Alabama|||| McKethan Stadium ||3–4||Murphy (6–0)||Hart (3–4)||Blankenship (3)||2,030||31–24
|13–16
|- align="center" bgcolor="ffdddd"
| May 16 || No. 12 Alabama|||| McKethan Stadium ||8–11||Blankenship (9–2)||Grezlovski (9–8)||None||2,797||31–25
|13–17
|-

Rankings from Collegiate Baseball. All times Eastern. Retrieved from FloridaGators.com

See also 
 Florida Gators
 List of Florida Gators baseball players

References

External links 
 Gator Baseball official website

Florida Gators baseball seasons
Florida Gators baseball team
Florida Gators